Procecidochares gibba is a species of tephritid or fruit flies in the genus Procecidochares of the family Tephritidae.

Distribution
Canada, United States.

References

Tephritinae
Insects described in 1873
Diptera of North America
Procecidochares